António Coelho Pinto (born 22 March 1966) is a retired Portuguese long-distance runner. He was born in Vila Garcia, Amarante.

Pinto won the London Marathon in 1992, 1997 and 2000, as well as the 10,000 metres final at the 1998 European Championships in Athletics in Budapest, Hungary. Pinto's best time in the marathon is 2:06:36. He competed in four consecutive Summer Olympics for his native country, beginning in 1988. He also won the Lisbon Half Marathon 1998. He retired in 2002.

Achievements

References

External links 

1966 births
Living people
Portuguese male long-distance runners
Portuguese male marathon runners
London Marathon male winners
Athletes (track and field) at the 1988 Summer Olympics
Athletes (track and field) at the 1992 Summer Olympics
Athletes (track and field) at the 1996 Summer Olympics
Athletes (track and field) at the 2000 Summer Olympics
Olympic athletes of Portugal
European Athletics Championships medalists
Berlin Marathon male winners